MDR may refer to:

Biology
 MDR1, an ATP-dependent cellular efflux pump affording multiple drug resistance
 Mammalian Diving reflex
 Medical device reporting
 Multiple drug resistance, when a microorganism has become resistant to multiple drugs

Technology
 Managed Detection and Response, a type of computer Managed security service
 Massive Data Repository, a data storage facility for the United States' Intelligence Community
 Sony MDR-V6, a line of studio headphones designed by Sony
 Medical device reprocessing
 Memory data register, a hardware register where data to be transferred to/from memory are temporarily stored
 Mental dead reckoning
 Merchant discount rate, dues, fees, assessments, network charges and mark-ups that merchants are required to pay for accepting credit and debit cards
 Metadata registry, a central location in an organization where metadata definitions are stored and maintained in a controlled method.
 Metadata repository, a database created to store metadata
 Mini D ribbon, a cable connector type
 Motion detection radar
 Multifactor dimensionality reduction, an algorithm for detecting interactions
 Desert Tech MDR, a bullpup rifle
 MDR, programming language

Other
 The Moldavian Democratic Republic, a state existing between 1917 and 1918, predecessor of modern Moldova
 mdr is the ISO 639 language code for the Mandar language
 M. D. Ramanathan (1923–1984), Indian singer known as MDR
 Mandatory declassification review, part of the process of removing the classification of a document
 2017 European Union Medical Device Regulation (EU2017/745), an EU regulation covering medical devices
 Mitteldeutscher Rundfunk, German public broadcaster
 Mort de rire, a French expression for "die laughing" (equivalent to English LOL)
 Mouvement démocratique républicain (Republican Democratic Movement), former political party of Rwanda
 "MDR" Stands for Major District Road in the State of Andhra Pradesh, India.

See also
 
 
 MD (disambiguation)
 MDRA (disambiguation)
 MRD (disambiguation)